Chechelnyk (earlier also Chichelnik; alternate spellings Chetschelnik, Chitchilnik, Cicelnic, Czeczelnik, Tschetschelnik) is an urban-type settlement on the Savranka River (a tributary of the Southern Bug) in Vinnytsia Oblast, Ukraine, near Odesa Oblast, located in the historic region of Podolia. Chechelnyk was formerly the administrative center of Chechelnyk Raion, although it is now administrated under Tulchyn Raion. The economy is based on the food industry, especially alcohol production. Population: 

The Brazilian writer Clarice Lispector was born in the town on December 10, 1920, during a pause in the family's journey to escape Russia.

History 
Chechelnyk was founded "as a refuge from Tatars and landlords" in the early 16th century and achieved the status of a town in 1635. Until the Partitions of Poland Czeczelnik was part of the Bracław Voivodeship of the Lesser Poland Province of the Polish Crown. It was a private town of Poland, owned by the House of Lubomirski.

Later it became part of the Podolian Governorate of the Russian Empire. Between 1795 and 1812 it was renamed Olgopil. In 1898 the population was 7,000, of whom 1,967 were Jews. Like most of Podillya, the town suffered terribly during the First World War and 1917-1921 Ukrainian War of Independence; during the summer of 1920, "the south of Podillya seethed with counterrevolution... and Olgopil County, where Chechelnyk is located, was the most unstable area in all of Podillya."

References

External links
Chechelnik at JewishEncyclopedia.com
Chechelnyk.com (in Ukrainian)
 

Urban-type settlements in Haisyn Raion
Cossack Hetmanate
Olgopolsky Uyezd